Who's Afraid of Conceptual Art is a 2009 book by Elisabeth Schellekens and Peter Goldie, in which the authors provide
a philosophical introduction to conceptual art.

References

External links
Who's Afraid of Conceptual Art

2009 non-fiction books
Aesthetics books
Routledge books
Conceptual art